K2000 may refer to:

 KITT from the television program Knight Rider
 The TV movie Knight Rider 2000
 The Pentax K2000 digital single-lens reflex camera, also known as the Pentax K-M
 The Kurzweil Music Systems K2000 electronic music keyboard